On Our Own Land is a 1948 film directed by France Štiglic. It was the first Slovene sound feature film. It was released on 21 November 1948 in Union Cinema in Ljubljana, received great public acclaim, and was entered into the 1949 Cannes Film Festival.

Plot 

The script was based (with significant changes) on the novella Grandpa Orel by Ciril Kosmač. It depicts the last two years of World War II in the Slovenian Littoral, annexed by the Italians. After their capitulation, the German army takes over a village. The movie tells about both the Partisan resistance forces and the villagers.

Filming
The film was shot on location in the black-and-white technique in the villages of Grahovo ob Bači and Koritnica.

Music
The music for the film was written by the composer Marjan Kozina.

See also
In the Kingdom of the Goldhorn, the first Slovene film

References

External links 
 The Theme Path On Our Own Land
 

Slovenian drama films
1948 films
Films based on short fiction
Films directed by France Štiglic
Slovene-language films
Yugoslav black-and-white films
Yugoslav war drama films
1948 war films
Films set in Yugoslavia
War films set in Partisan Yugoslavia
Yugoslav World War II films